The Federation of Industry (FI) is a trade union representing workers in primary and manufacturing industries in Spain.

The union was founded in 2014, when the former Federation of Industry merged with the Federation of Textile, Leather, Chemical and Allied Industries.  Like both its predecessors, it affiliated to the Workers' Commissions (CCOO).  In 2016, it absorbed the Federation of Agrifood.  After the merger, it had 231,000 members, making it the largest affiliate of CCOO.

General Secretaries
2014: Agustín Martín Martinez

References

External links

Manufacturing trade unions
Trade unions established in 2014
Trade unions in Spain